Abdurrahman Wahid (born Abdurrahman ad-Dakhil; 7 September 1940 – 30 December 2009), though more colloquially known as Gus Dur, was an Indonesian politician and Islamic religious leader who served as the 4th president of Indonesia, from his election in 1999 until his removal from power in 2001.  A long time leader within the Nahdlatul Ulama organization, he was the founder of the National Awakening Party (PKB). He was the son of Minister of Religious Affairs Wahid Hasyim, and the grandson of Nahdatul Ulama founder Hasyim Asy'ari. He had a visual impairment caused by glaucoma. He was blind on the left eye and partially blind on his right eye. He was the first and as of 2022 the only president of Indonesia to have had physical disabilities.

His popular nickname 'Gus Dur' is derived from Gus, a common honorific for a son of kyai, and from the short-form of bagus ('handsome lad' in Javanese); and Dur, short-form of his name, Abdurrahman.

Early life

Abdurrahman ad-Dakhil was born on the fourth day of the eighth month of the Islamic calendar in 1940 in Jombang, East Java to Abdul Wahid Hasyim and Siti Sholehah. This led to a belief that he was born on 4 August; instead, using the Islamic calendar to mark his birth date meant that he was actually born on 4 Sha'aban, equivalent to 7 September 1940.

He was named after Abd ar-Rahman I of the Umayyad Caliphate who brought Islam to Spain and was thus nicknamed "ad-Dakhil" ("the conqueror"). His name is stylized in the traditional Arabic naming system as "Abdurrahman, son of Wahid". Abdurrahman is of Chinese, Arab and Javanese ancestry. From his paternal line, he is descended from a well-known Moslem missionary from China known as Syekh Abdul Qadir Tan Kiem Han who was a disciple of Sunan Ngampel-Denta (Raden Rahmat Bong Swie Hoo) – one of the Nine Wali (Holy Islamic Saints) who became one of the first Islamic Kings on Java who islamicized Java in the 15-16th centuries.

He was the oldest of his five siblings, and was born into a very prestigious family in the East Java Muslim community. His paternal grandfather, Hasyim Asy'ari was the founder of Nahdlatul Ulama (NU) while his maternal grandfather, Bisri Syansuri was the first Muslim educator to introduce classes for women.

After Indonesian Declaration of Independence on 17 August 1945, Wahid moved back to Jombang and remained there during the fight for independence from the Netherlands during the Indonesian National Revolution. At the end of the war in 1949, Wahid moved to Jakarta as his father had been appointed Minister of Religious Affairs. He was educated in Jakarta, going to KRIS Primary School before moving to Matraman Perwari Primary School. Wahid was also encouraged to read non-Muslim books, magazines, and newspapers by his father to further broaden his horizons. He stayed in Jakarta with his family even after his father's removal as Minister of Religious Affairs in 1952. In April 1953, Wahid's father died in a car crash.

In 1954, Wahid began Junior High School. That year, he failed to graduate to the next year and was forced to repeat. His mother then made the decision to send him to Yogyakarta to continue his education. In 1957, after graduating from Junior High School, he moved to Magelang to begin Muslim Education at Tegalrejo Pesantren (Muslim school). He completed the pesantren course in two years instead of the usual four. In 1959, he moved back to Jombang to Pesantren Tambakberas. There, while continuing his own education, Wahid also received his first job as a teacher and later on as headmaster of a madrasah affiliated with the pesantren. Wahid also found employment as a journalist for magazines such as Horizon and Majalah Budaya Jaya.

Overseas education
In 1963, Wahid received a scholarship from the Ministry of Religious Affairs to study at Al Azhar University in Cairo, Egypt. He left for Egypt in November 1963. Unable to provide evidence to certify that he spoke Arabic, Wahid was told when arriving that he would have to take a remedial class in the language before enrolling at the university's Higher Institute for Islamic and Arabic studies.

Instead of attending classes, Wahid spent 1964 enjoying life in Egypt; watching European and American movies as well indulging in his hobby of watching football. Wahid was also involved with the Association of Indonesian Students and became a journalist for the association's magazine. After passing the remedial Arabic examination, he finally began studies at the Higher Institute for Islamic and Arabic Studies in 1965, but was disappointed as he had already studied many of the texts offered at the Institute in Java and disapproved of the rote learning method used by the university.

In Egypt, Wahid found employment with the Indonesian Embassy. It was during his stint with the embassy that coup attempt was launched by the 30 September Movement, which the Communist Party of Indonesia was accused of leading. With Army Strategic Reserves commander Major General Suharto taking control of the situation in Jakarta, a crackdown against suspected communists was initiated. The Indonesian Embassy in Egypt was ordered to conduct an investigation into the political views of university students. This order was passed to Wahid, who was charged with writing the reports.

Wahid's displeasure at the method of education and his work following the coup attempt distracted him from his studies. He sought and received another scholarship at the University of Baghdad and moved to Iraq. There Wahid continued his involvement with the Association of Indonesian Students as well as with writing journalistic pieces to be read in Indonesia.

After completing his education at the University of Baghdad in 1970, Wahid went to the Netherlands to continue his education. He wanted to attend Leiden University but was disappointed as there was little recognition for the studies that he had undertaken at the University of Baghdad. From the Netherlands, he went to Germany and France before returning to Indonesia in 1971.

Early career
Wahid returned to Jakarta expecting that in a year's time, he would be abroad again to study at McGill University in Canada. He kept himself busy by joining the Institute for Economic and Social Research, Education and Information (LP3ES), an organization which consisted of intellectuals with progressive Muslims and social-democratic views. LP3ES established the magazine Prisma and Wahid became one of the main contributors to the magazine. Whilst working as a contributor for LP3ES, he also conducted tours to pesantren and madrasah across Java. It was a time when pesantren were desperate to gain state funding by adopting state-endorsed curricula and Wahid was concerned that the traditional values of the pesantren were being damaged because of this change. He was also concerned with the poverty of the pesantren which he saw during his tours. At the same time as it was encouraging pesantren to adopt state-endorsed curricula, the Government was also encouraging pesantren as agents for change and to help assist the government in the economic development of Indonesia. It was at this time that Wahid finally decided to drop plans for overseas studies in favor of promoting the development of the pesantren.

Wahid continued his career as a journalist, writing for the magazine Tempo and Kompas, a leading Indonesian newspaper. His articles were well received, and he began to develop a reputation as a social commentator. Wahid's popularity was such that at this time he was invited to give lectures and seminars, obliging him to travel back and forth between Jakarta and Jombang, where he now lived with his family.

Despite having a successful career up to that point, Wahid still found it hard to make ends meet, and he worked to earn extra income by selling peanuts and delivering ice to be used for his wife's Es Lilin (popsicle) business. In 1974, he found extra employment in Jombang as a Muslim Legal Studies teacher at Pesantren Tambakberas and soon developed a good reputation. A year later, Wahid added to his workload as a teacher of Kitab al-Hikam, a classical text of sufism.

In 1977, Wahid joined the Hasyim Asyari University as Dean of the Faculty of Islamic Beliefs and Practices. Again he excelled in his job and the university wanted to him to teach extra subjects such as pedagogy, sharia, and missiology. However, his excellence caused some resentment from within the ranks of university and he was blocked from teaching the subjects. Whilst undertaking all these ventures he also regularly delivered speeches during Ramadan to the Muslim community in Jombang.

Leader of Nahdlatul Ulama

Early involvement with NU
Wahid's family background meant that sooner or later, he would be asked to play an active role in the running of Nahdlatul Ulama (NU). This ran contrary to Wahid's aspirations of becoming a public intellectual and he had twice rejected offers to join the NU Religious Advisory Council. Nevertheless, Wahid finally chose to join the Council when his own grandfather, Bisri Syansuri gave him the third offer. In taking this job, Wahid also made the decision to move from Jombang to Jakarta and to permanently reside there. As a member of the Religious Advisory Council, Wahid envisioned himself as a reformer of NU.

At this time, Wahid also had his first political experience. In the lead-up to the 1982 Legislative Elections, Wahid campaigned for the United Development Party (PPP), an Islamist Party which was formed as a result of a merger of four Islamist parties including NU. Wahid recalled that the Government actively disrupted PPP's campaigns by arresting people like himself. However, Wahid was always able to secure his release, having developed connections in high places with the likes of General Benny Moerdani.

Reforming NU
By this time, many  viewed the NU as a stagnant organization. After careful discussion, the Religious Advisory Council finally formed a Team of Seven (which included Wahid) to tackle the issues of reform and to help revitalize the NU. For some members of the NU, reform in the organization involved a change of leadership. On 2 May 1982, a group of high-ranking NU officials met with NU chairman Idham Chalid and asked for his resignation. Idham, who had guided the NU in the transition from Sukarno to Suharto resisted at first but bowed down to pressure. On 6 May 1982, Wahid heard of Idham's decision to resign and approached him saying that the demands being made for him to resign were unconstitutional. With urging from Wahid, Idham withdrew his resignation and Wahid, together with the Team of Seven was able to negotiate a compromise between Idham and those who had asked for his resignation.

In 1983, Suharto was re-elected to a fourth term as president by the People's Consultative Assembly (MPR) and began taking steps to establish the Pancasila state ideology as the sole basis for all organizations. From June 1983 to October 1983, Wahid was part of a team which was commissioned to prepare the NU's response to this issue. Wahid consulted texts such as the Quran and Sunnah for justification and finally, in October 1983, concluded that the NU should accept Pancasila as its ideology. To further revitalize the NU, Wahid was also successful in securing its withdrawal from PPP and party politics to allow it focus on social matters instead of hampering itself by being involved in politics.

Election to chairmanship and first term as chairman
Wahid's reforms had made him extremely popular within the ranks of NU. By the time of the 1984 National Congress, many began to state their intentions to nominate Wahid as the new chairman of NU. Wahid accepted the nomination, provided that he had the power to choose who would be on his leadership team. Wahid was elected as the new chairman of NU during the National Congress. However, his stipulation of choosing his own team was not honored. The last day of the Congress had begun with Wahid's list of team members being approved by high-ranking NU officials including outgoing Chairman Idham. Wahid had gone to the Committee in charge of running the Congress and handed in his list which was to be announced later. However, the Committee in question was against Idham and announced a totally different list of people. Wahid was outraged but was pressured to accept the changes made.

Wahid's ascendancy to the NU chairmanship was seen positively by Suharto and his New Order regime. Wahid's acceptance of Pancasila along with his moderate image won him favor among Government ranks. In 1985, Suharto made Wahid a Pancasila indoctrinator. In 1987, Wahid showed further support for the regime by criticizing PPP in the lead-up to the 1987 Legislative Elections and further strengthening Suharto's Golkar Party. His reward came in the form of a membership of the MPR. Although he was viewed with favor by the regime, Wahid criticised the Government over the Kedung Ombo Dam project that was funded by the World Bank. Although this somewhat soured the cordial relationships that Wahid had with the Government, Suharto was still keen on getting political support from NU.

During his first term as chairman of NU, Wahid focused on reform of the pesantren education system and was successful in increasing the quality of pesantren education system so that it can match up with secular schools. In 1987, Wahid also set up study groups in Probolinggo, East Java to provide a forum for like-minded individuals within NU to discuss and provide interpretations to Muslim texts. Critics accused Wahid of wishing to replace the Arabic Muslim greeting of "assalamualaikum" with the secular greeting of "selamat pagi", which means good morning in Indonesian.

Second term as chairman and opposing the New Order
Wahid was re-elected to a second term as chairman of NU at the 1989 National Congress. By this time, Suharto, embroiled in a political battle with ABRI, began to ingratiate himself with the Muslim constituency so as to win their support. This venture reached a turning point in December 1990 with the formation of the Indonesian Association of Muslim Intellectuals (Ikatan Cendekiawan Muslim Indonesia or ICMI). This organization was backed by Suharto, chaired by BJ Habibie and included Muslim intellectuals such as Amien Rais and Nurcholish Madjid as its members. In 1991, various members of ICMI asked Wahid to join. Wahid declined because he thought that ICMI encouraged sectarianism and that it was mainly a means by which Suharto manoeuvred to remain powerful. In 1991, Wahid countered ICMI by forming the Democracy Forum, an organization which contained 45 intellectuals from various religious and social communities. The organization was seen as a threat by the government, which moved to break up meetings held by the Democracy Forum during the run-up to the 1992 Legislative Elections approached.

In March 1992, Wahid planned to have a Great Assembly to celebrate the 66th anniversary of the founding of NU and to reiterate the organization's support for Pancasila. Wahid had planned for the event to be attended by at least one million NU members. However, Suharto moved to block the event, ordering policemen to turn back busloads of NU members as they arrived in Jakarta. Nevertheless, the event managed to attract 200,000 attendants. After the event, Wahid wrote a letter of protest to Suharto saying that NU had not been given a chance to display a brand of Islam that was open, fair, and tolerant. During his second term as chairman of NU, Wahid's liberal ideas had begun to turn many supporters sour. As chairman, Wahid continued to push for inter-faith dialogue and even accepted an invitation to visit Israel in October 1994.

Third term as chairman and the lead-up to Reformasi
As the 1994 National Congress approached, Wahid nominated himself for a third term as chairman. Hearing this, Suharto wanted to make sure that Wahid was not elected. In the weeks leading up to the Congress, Suharto supporters, such as Habibie and Harmoko campaigned against Wahid's re-election. When it came time for the National Congress, the site for the Congress was tightly guarded by ABRI in an act of intimidation. Despite this, and attempts to bribe NU members to vote against him, Wahid was re-elected as NU chairman for a third term. During his third term, Wahid began to move closer towards a political alliance with Megawati Sukarnoputri from the Indonesian Democratic Party (PDI). Capitalizing on her father's legacy, Megawati had a lot of popularity and intended to put political and moral pressure on Suharto's regime. Wahid advised Megawati to be cautious and to avoid being nominated as president during the 1998 MPR General Session. Megawati ignored Wahid's advice and paid the price in July 1996 when her PDI headquarters were taken over by supporters of Government-backed PDI chairman, Suryadi.

Seeing what happened to Megawati, Wahid thought that his best option now was to retreat politically by getting himself back in favor with the Government. In November 1996, Wahid and Suharto met for the first time since Wahid's re-election to the NU chairmanship and this was followed over the next few months by meetings with various Government people who in 1994 had attempted to block Wahid's re-election. At the same time, however, Wahid kept his options for reform open and in December 1996, had a meeting with Amien Rais, an ICMI member who had grown critical of the regime.

July 1997 saw the beginning of the Asian Financial Crisis. Suharto began to lose control of the situation and just as he was being pushed to step up the reform movement with Megawati and Amien, Wahid experienced a stroke in January 1998. From his hospital bed, Wahid continued to see the situation worsen with Suharto's re-election to a seventh term as president accompanied by student protests.  The protests would turn into riots in May 1998 after the killing of four students at Trisakti University. On 19 May 1998, Wahid, together with eight prominent leaders from the Muslim community were summoned to Suharto's residence. Suharto outlined the idea of a Reform Committee which he had begun to propose at the time. All nine rejected Suharto's offer to join the Reform Committee. Wahid maintained a more moderate stance with Suharto and called on the protesting to stop to see if Suharto was going to implement his promise. This displeased Amien who was one of the most vocal of Suharto's critics at the time. Nevertheless, support for Suharto quickly ebbed away and on 21 May 1998 he resigned the presidency. Vice President Habibie became president.

Reformasi

Formation of PKB and the Ciganjur statement
One of the immediate effects of Suharto's fall was the formation of new political parties. Under Suharto's regime, political parties had been limited to just three; Golkar, PPP, and PDI. Now with his fall, new political parties were formed, the most prominent of which were Amien's National Mandate Party (PAN) and Megawati's Indonesian Democratic Party-Struggle (PDI-P). In June 1998, many from within the NU community began pressuring Wahid to form a new political party. Wahid did not warm up to the idea immediately, thinking that this would result in a political party which only catered to one religion. He was also unwilling to overrule his own decision to take NU out of politics. By July 1998, however, he began to warm up to the idea, thinking that establishing a political party was the only way to challenge the organizationally strong Golkar in an election. With that in mind, Wahid approved of the formation of PKB and became the chairman of its Advisory Council with Matori Abdul Djalil as party chairman. Although it was clearly dominated by NU members, Wahid promoted the PKB as a party that was non-sectarian and open to all members of society.

As opposition to the government, Wahid, together with Megawati and Amien were willing to adopt a moderate stance towards Habibie's Government, preferring instead to wait for the 1999 legislative elections. Nevertheless, in November 1998, in a meeting at his residence in the Jakarta suburb of Ciganjur, Wahid, together with Megawati, Amien, and Sultan Hamengkubuwono X reiterated their commitment to reform. On 7 February 1999, PKB officially declared Wahid as their presidential candidate.

1999 elections and MPR General Session

In June 1999, Wahid's PKB entered the legislative elections. The PKB won 12% of the votes with Megawati's PDI–P winning the legislative elections with 33% of the votes. With her party decisively winning the legislative elections, Megawati expected to win the presidency against Habibie at the MPR General Session. However, the PDI-P did not have complete majority and formed a loose alliance with the PKB. In July, however, Amien Rais would form the Central Axis, a coalition of Muslim parties. The Central Axis then began to consider nominating Wahid as a third candidate in the presidential race and the PKB's commitment towards PDI-P began to waver.

In October 1999, the MPR convened and Wahid threw his support behind Amien, who was elected as the chairman of the MPR. On 7 October 1999, Amien and the Central Axis, who now had the PKB on their side, officially nominated Wahid as a presidential candidate. On 19 October 1999, the MPR rejected Habibie's accountability speech and Habibie withdrew from the presidential race. In the hours that followed, Akbar Tanjung, chairman of Golkar and head of the People's Representative Council (DPR) made it clear that Golkar would support Wahid in his bid for the presidency. On 20 October 1999, the MPR convened and began voting for a new president. Wahid was elected as Indonesia's fourth president with 373 votes to Megawati's 313 votes.

Displeased that their candidate had not won the presidency, Megawati's supporters began to riot. Wahid realized that for this to stop, Megawati had to be elected as vice president. After convincing General Wiranto not to contest vice presidential elections and getting the PKB to endorse Megawati, Wahid persuaded the demoralized Megawati to stand. On 21 October 1999, Megawati defeated the PPP's Hamzah Haz and was inaugurated as vice president.

Presidency

1999

Wahid's first Cabinet, dubbed the National Unity Cabinet, was a coalition cabinet which consisted of members of various political parties: PDI-P, PKB, Golkar, PPP, PAN, and the Justice Party (PK). Non-partisans and the TNI (Formerly known as ABRI) were also represented in the Cabinet. Wahid then went on to make two administrative reforms. The first administrative reform was to abolish the Ministry of Information, the Suharto regime's main weapon in controlling the media, while the second administrative reform was to disband the Ministry of Social Affairs which had become corrupt and extortionist under the Suharto regime.

In November, Wahid made his first overseas trip, visiting ASEAN member countries, Japan, the United States of America, Qatar, Kuwait, and Jordan. He followed this up in December by a visit to the People's Republic of China.

After only a month in the National Unity Cabinet, Coordinating Minister of People's Welfare Hamzah Haz announced his resignation in November. There was suspicion that the resignation was brought about by Wahid's allegation that certain members of his Cabinet were involved in corruption while he was still in America. Others suggested that Hamzah's resignation was because of displeasure due to Wahid's conciliatory stance towards Israel.

Wahid's plan in Aceh was to give it a referendum. However, this referendum would be to decide on various modes of autonomy rather than to decide on independence like in East Timor. Wahid also wanted to adopt a softer stance towards Aceh by having fewer military personnel on the ground. On 30 December, Wahid visited Jayapura in Papua, the province which was then known as Irian Jaya. During his visit, Wahid was successful in convincing Papuan leaders that he was a force for change and even encouraged the use of the name Papua.

2000

In January, Wahid made another overseas trip to Switzerland to attend the World Economic Forum and visited Saudi Arabia on the way back to Indonesia. In February, Wahid made another trip to Europe visiting the United Kingdom, France, the Netherlands, Germany, and Italy. On the way back to Europe, Wahid also visited India, South Korea, Thailand, and Brunei. March saw Wahid visit East Timor. In April, Wahid visited South Africa en route to the G77 summit in Cuba before returning via Mexico City and Hong Kong. In June, Wahid once again visited America, Japan, and France with Iran, Pakistan, and Egypt as the new additions to the list of countries which he had visited.

Cabinet dismissals
While he was travelling to Europe in February, Wahid began asking for the resignation of General Wiranto, who held the position of Coordinating Minister of Politics and Security. Wahid saw Wiranto both as an obstacle to his planned reform of the Military as well as being a liability to his Government with his human rights abuses in East Timor. 
When Wahid arrived back in Jakarta, Wiranto talked to him and seemed successful in convincing Wahid not to replace him. However, Wahid would change his mind and ask for his resignation. In April 2000, Wahid dismissed Minister of Industry and Trade Jusuf Kalla and Minister of State Owned Enterprises Laksamana Sukardi. The explanation that he gave was that the two were involved in corruption, although he never gave evidence to back it up. This move soured Wahid's relations with Golkar and PDI-P.

Aceh
In March 2000, Wahid's Government began to open negotiations with the Free Aceh Movement (GAM). Two months later, in May, the Government signed a memorandum of understanding with GAM to last until the beginning of 2001, by which time both signatories would have breached the agreement.

Other overtures toward reconciliation
In March 2000, Wahid suggested that the 1966 Provisional People's Consultative Assembly (MPRS) resolution on the banning of Marxism–Leninism be lifted.

Wahid also moved to establish commercial relations with Israel, which aroused the ire of many Indonesian Muslim groups. This was one issue that arose in the briefing given to a Palestinian parliamentary delegation in 2000 by Riddhi Awad, their ambassador to Indonesia. Another issue was Wahid's membership in the Shimon Peres Foundation. Both Wahid and his foreign minister Alwi Shihab took offense at the inaccurate portrayals of the Indonesian president, and Alwi called for the replacement of Awad. However, Nurcholish Madjid pointed out that Wahid's personal neutrality toward the Israel-Palestine conflict should yield to the feelings of the "majority" of Indonesians, who support Palestine.

Wahid visited Israel six times. In a 2004 interview, he said, "I think there is a wrong perception that Islam is in disagreement with Israel. This is caused by Arab propaganda. We have to distinguish between Arabs and Islam. Some people in Indonesia claimed that I was a stooge for the West, but the fact that I am gaining in popularity all the time dispels this idea, and shows that this is the view of only a small minority of the elite. I always say that China and the Soviet Union have or had atheism as part of their constitution, but we have long-term relationships with both these countries. So then Israel has a reputation as a nation with a high regard for God and religion — there is then no reason we have to be against Israel."

Relationship with TNI
When he ascended to the presidency, one of Wahid's goals was to reform the military and to take it out of its dominant socio-political role. In this venture, Wahid found an ally in Agus Wirahadikusumah who he made Commander of Kostrad in March. In July, Agus began uncovering a scandal involving Dharma Putra, a foundation with affiliations to Kostrad. Through Megawati, TNI members began pressuring Wahid to remove Agus. Wahid gave in to the pressure but then planned to have Agus appointed as the Army Chief of Staff to which TNI top brass responded by threatening to retire and Wahid once again bowed down to pressure.

Wahid's relationship with the TNI deteriorated even further in July 2000 when it was revealed that Laskar Jihad had arrived in Maluku and was being armed by the TNI. Laskar Jihad, a radical Islamic militia had earlier in the year planned to go to Maluku and assist Muslims there in their communal conflict with the Christians. Wahid had ordered TNI to block Laskar Jihad from going to Maluku, but nevertheless they still made it to Maluku and they were then being armed with what turned out to be TNI weapons.

Buloggate and Bruneigate
2000 saw Wahid embroiled in two scandals which would damage his presidency. In May, the Logistic Affairs Agency (BULOG) reported that US$4 million were missing from its cash reserve. The missing cash was then attributed to Wahid's own masseur, who had claimed that Wahid sent him to Bulog to collect the cash. Although the money was returned, Wahid's opponents took the chance of accusing him of being involved in the scandal and of being aware of what his masseur was up to. At the same time, Wahid was also accused of keeping US$2 million for himself. The money was a donation by the Sultan of Brunei to provide assistance in Aceh. However, Wahid failed to account for the money.

2000 MPR Annual Session and Cabinet reshuffle
As the 2000 MPR Annual Session approached, Wahid's popularity with the people was still at a high and politically, allies such as Megawati, Akbar, and Amien were still willing to support Wahid despite the sacking of the ministers and the scandals which he had been involved in. At the same time, however, they were asking questions of Wahid. At the 2000 MPR Annual Session, Wahid delivered a speech which was well received by a majority of the MPR members. During the speech, Wahid recognized his weakness as an administrator and said that he was going to delegate the day-to-day running of the government to a senior minister. The MPR members agreed but proposed that Megawati should be the one to receive the task from the President. At first the MPR planned to have this proposal adopted as a resolution but a presidential decision was seen as enough. On 23 August, Wahid announced a new Cabinet despite Megawati's insistence that the announcement was delayed. Megawati showed her displeasure by not showing up for the Cabinet announcement. The new Cabinet was smaller and consisted of more non-partisans. There were no Golkar members in this Cabinet.

Regional unrest
In September, Wahid declared martial law in Maluku as the condition there continued to deteriorate. By now, it was evident that Laskar Jihad were being assisted by TNI members and it was also apparent that they were financed by Fuad Bawazier, the last Minister of Finance to have served under Suharto. During the same month, the West Papuans raised their Morning Star flag. Wahid's response was to allow the West Papuans to do this provided that the Morning Star flag was placed lower than the Indonesian flag. For this, he was severely criticized by Megawati and Akbar. On 24 December 2000, there was Terrorist Attack directed against churches in Jakarta and in eight cities across Indonesia.

Gathering political opposition
By the end of 2000, there were many within the political elite who were disillusioned with Wahid. The most obvious person who showed this disillusion was Amien who showed regret at supporting Wahid to the presidency the previous year. Amien also attempted to rally opposition by encouraging Megawati and Akbar to flex their political muscles. Megawati surprisingly defended Wahid whilst Akbar preferred to wait for the 2004 Legislative Elections. At the end of November, 151 DPR members signed a petition calling for the impeachment of Wahid.

2001 and removal from power

In January, Wahid made the announcement that Chinese New Year was to become an optional holiday. Wahid followed this up in February by lifting the ban on the display of Chinese characters and the imports of Chinese publications. In February, Wahid visited Northern Africa as well as Saudi Arabia to undertake the hajj pilgrimage. Wahid made his last overseas visit in June 2001 when he visited Australia.

At a meeting with university rectors on 27 January 2001, Wahid commented on the possibility of Indonesia descending into anarchy. Wahid then made the suggestion that he may be forced to dissolve the DPR if that happened. Although the meeting was off-the-record, it caused quite a stir and added to the fuel of the movement against him. On 1 February, the DPR met to issue a memorandum against Wahid. Two memorandums constitute an MPR Special Session where the impeachment and removal of a president would be legal. The vote was overwhelmingly for the memorandum and PKB members could only walk out in protest. The memorandum caused widespread protests by NU members. In East Java, NU members went around to Golkar's regional offices and trashed it. In Jakarta, Wahid's opposition began accusing him of encouraging the protests. Wahid denied it and went to talk to the protesters at the town of Pasuruan; encouraging them to get off the streets. Nevertheless, NU protesters continued to show their support for Wahid and in April, made the announcement that they were ready to defend and die for the President.

In March, Wahid tried to counter the opposition by moving against dissidents within his own Cabinet. Minister of Justice Yusril Ihza Mahendra was removed for making public his demands for the President's resignation while Minister of Forestry Nur Mahmudi Ismail was also removed under the suspicion of channelling his department's funds to Wahid's opposition. In response to this, Megawati began to distance herself and did not show up for the inauguration of the Ministers' replacement. On 30 April, the DPR issued a second memorandum and on the next day called for an MPR Special Session to be held on 1 August. On 12 June, he shuffled his cabinet to shore up support.

By July, Wahid grew desperate and ordered Susilo Bambang Yudhoyono, the Coordinating Minister for Politics and Security to declare a State of Emergency. Yudhoyono refused and Wahid removed him from his position. Finally on 20 July, Amien declared that the MPR Special Session will be brought forward to 23 July. TNI, having had a bad relationship with Wahid through his tenure as president, stationed 40,000 troops in Jakarta and placed tanks with their turrets pointing at the Presidential Palace in a show of force. To prevent the MPR Special Session from taking place, Wahid then enacted a Decree disbanding the MPR on 23 July despite having no power to do so. In defiance against Wahid's decree, the MPR continued the Special Session and unanimously voted to impeach Wahid. The same session also saw the MPR voted to affirm Megawati succession to the presidency, effectively replacing him. Wahid continued to insist that he was the president and stayed for some days in the Presidential Palace, but eventually left the residence on 25 July for a trip overseas to the United States for health treatments.

Post-presidency activities

Schism within the PKB
After his impeachment, Wahid turned his eyes to Matori Abdul Djalil, who was the chairman of PKB. Before the MPR Special Session, it was agreed upon that no PKB members would attend as a sign of solidarity. However, Matori insisted on attending because he was a vice-chairman of the MPR and participated in the impeachment process. Using his position as chairman of the Advisory Council, Wahid sacked Matori as chairman of PKB on 15 August 2001 and suspended him from party activities before stripping Matori of Party membership in November. On 14 January 2002, Matori held a Special National Congress attended by his supporters in PKB. The Special National Congress re-elected him to the position of PKB chairman. Wahid countered this by holding his own PKB National Congress on 17 January, a day after Matori's Congress ended The National Congress re-elected Wahid to the position of chairman of the Advisory Council and elected Alwi Shihab as its chairman. Wahid's PKB would be known as PKB Kuningan whilst Matori's PKB would be known as PKB Batutulis.

2004 legislative and presidential elections
In April 2004, PKB received 10.6% of the vote in the National Legislative Elections and nominated Wahid as their presidential candidate, but due to a failed medical examination required by Indonesian law, Wahid's candidature was disqualified. Wahid then threw his support behind Wiranto of the Golkar party, as Wahid's brother, Salahuddin, was Wiranto's running mate. Wiranto and Salahuddin came third. For the run-off elections, held on 20 September 2004 between candidates Yudhoyono and Megawati, Wahid declared no support for either candidate and abstained from voting.

Opposition to Yudhoyono Government
In August 2005, Wahid became one of the leaders of a political coalition called the United Awakened Archipelago (Koalisi Nusantara Bangkit Bersatu). Along with Try Sutrisno, Wiranto, Akbar Tanjung, and Megawati, this coalition criticized the policies of the Yudhoyono Government, specifically about the withdrawal of fuel subsidies which they argued would raise the price of fuel.

In September 2006, Wahid said that he would run in the 2009 presidential election He confirmed this in March 2008, at a rally of his National Awakening Party (PKB) in Banjarmasin, South Kalimantan.

Other activities
The Wahid Institute is a Jakarta-based nonprofit organization founded by Wahid in 2004, now led by his daughter, Yenni Wahid.

Wahid served as patron, member of the board of directors and senior advisor to the LibForAll ("Liberty for All") Foundation, whose mission it is to reduce religious extremism and discredit terrorism worldwide.

Wahid wrote an article published in the Wall Street Journal on 30 December 2005 entitled Right Islam vs. Wrong Islam in which he called on "people of good will of every faith and nation" to unite against the religious hatred that underlies and animates terrorism.

Wahid discussed his suspicions regarding the involvement of the Indonesian government and Indonesia's armed forces in the terrorist bombings on Bali, in an interview in the documentary Inside Indonesia's War on Terrorism, aired by SBS Dateline on 12 October 2005.

Religious views
Wahid said:

In a 2009 dialogue with Buddhist leader Daisaku Ikeda, Wahid said:

In a 2002 interview with Australian television program, "Foreign Correspondent", Wahid explained his respect for Israel and posed a challenging "correction" to be addressed by his fellow Muslims:

Wahid was an advocate of interfaith dialogue and sat on the Board of World Religious Leaders for the Elijah Interfaith Institute.

Personal life
Wahid was married to Sinta Nuriyah with whom he had four daughters: Alissa Qotrunnada Munawaroh, Zannuba Arifah Chafsoh (popularly known as Yenny Wahid), Annita Hayatunnufus, and Inayah Wulandari.

Health Issues 
Wahid was visually impaired throughout his presidency, although many claimed that he was able to see without assistance. Nevertheless, during his inauguration as president, he was helped by an army officer who acted as an assistant by re-reading the text of presidential oath during his inauguration. His eyesight began to deteriorate due to glaucoma since 1985, and worsened by an accident where he was hit by a car which resulted in the loss of a retina. Consequently, he was helped by some trusted assistants who acted as his "eyes". He was also alleged to have sleeping disorder as he was sometimes caught sleeping during important cabinet meetings.

Death

In late December 2009, despite poor health and a recent hospital visit, Wahid asked to be taken to visit Rembang (situated in Central Java) and Jombang. During the trip his health worsened and Wahid was admitted to hospital in Jombang on 24 December 2009. He was moved to Cipto Mangunkusumo Hospital in Central Jakarta the following day to undergo dialysis. He also underwent dental surgery on 28 December after complaining of toothache. Wahid died on 30 December at approximately 6:45 pm local time (UTC+7) due to complications from kidney disorders, heart disease and diabetes. President Susilo Bambang Yudhoyono visited Wahid shortly before his death. A state funeral was held for Wahid on 31 December, and flags were flown at half-staff for seven days. He was buried next to his grandparents and parents at his birthplace, Jombang, East Java.

Awards 
In 1993, Abdurrahman Wahid received the prestigious Magsaysay Award for his efforts to promote inter-religious relations in Indonesia within a democratic society. The award is referred to as 'Asia's Nobel Prize'.
He was conferred honorary doctorates by the Netanya University (Israel), Konkuk and Sun Moon University (South Korea), Soka Gakkai University (Japan), Thammasat University (Thailand), Pantheon-Sorbonne University (France), and many other universities around the world.

National honours 

  Star of the Republic of Indonesia, 1st Class (23 February 2001)
  Star of Mahaputera, 1st Class (23 February 2001)
  Star of Mahaputera, 2nd Class (17 August 1998)
  Star of Mahaputera, 3rd Class (13 August 1998)
  Star of Merit, 1st Class (23 February 2001)
  Star of Culture Parama Dharma (23 February 2001)
  Star of Yudha Dharma, 1st Class (23 February 2001)
  Star of Kartika Eka Paksi, 1st Class (23 February 2001)
  Star of Jalasena, 1st Class (23 February 2001)
  Star of Swa Bhuwana Paksa, 1st Class (23 February 2001)
  Star of Bhayangkara, 1st Class (23 February 2001)

References

Notes

Sources

External links

 Official website
 Gusdurnet
 Jaringan Gusdurian
 Wahid Institute
 Erdal Can Alkoçlar
 LibForAll Foundation
 "Australia owes a debt of gratitude to Indonesia's accidental president", Greg Barton, The Australian, 2 January 2010 – necrology focusing on Abdurrahman Wahid's presidency, and on his relation with neighbouring country Australia
 "Wahid and the Voice of Moderate Islam" by Paul Wolfowitz – Opinionjournal.com – 6 January 2010 (9:49 pm ET)
 Who was Gus Dur? Obituary Radio France Internationale in English
 https://web.archive.org/web/20160304072124/http://tebuireng.org/diskusi-novel-mata-penakluk-di-tebuireng/
 https://web.archive.org/web/20150702160646/http://www.mediaindonesia.com/mipagi/read/9041/Gus-Dur-Hidup-lewat-Novel/2015/03/08
 https://sea.lib.niu.edu/islandora/object/SEAImages%3AITvVideos, By Abolishing the Ministry of Information, which controlled licenses for any mass media operations, TV stations no longer needed permission for what they could produce.

Interview on SBS Dateline
 SBS Dateline Documentary
 

1940 births
2009 deaths
Presidents of Indonesia
Indonesian journalists
Indonesian Muslims
University of Baghdad alumni
Al-Azhar University alumni
Blind politicians
Candidates in the 2009 Indonesian presidential election
Javanese people
People from Jombang Regency
National Awakening Party politicians
Nahdlatul Ulama
Abdurrahman
Indonesian politicians of Chinese descent
Overseas Chinese Presidents
20th-century journalists
Impeached presidents removed from office
Deaths from kidney disease
Deaths from diabetes